Sorolopha stygiaula is a moth of the family Tortricidae. It is found in Thailand and Java.

The wingspan is about 17 mm. Adults are light grey with a characteristic purple-fuscous, almost black longitudinal broad streak. The hindwings are dark fuscous with a much paler basal half.

References

Moths described in 1933
Olethreutini
Moths of Asia